The American Society of Naturalists was founded in 1883 and is one of the oldest professional societies dedicated to the biological sciences in North America. The purpose of the Society is "to advance and diffuse knowledge of organic evolution and other broad biological principles so as to enhance the conceptual unification of the biological sciences."

Founded in Massachusetts with Alpheus Spring Packard Jr. as its first president, it was called the Society of Naturalists of the Eastern United States until 1886.

The scientific journal The American Naturalist is published on behalf of the society, which also holds an annual meeting with a scientific program of symposia and contributed papers and posters. It also confers a number of awards for achievement in evolutionary biology and/or ecology, including the Sewall Wright Award (named in honor of Sewall Wright) for senior researchers making "fundamental contributions ... to the conceptual unification of the biological sciences", the E. O. Wilson award for "significant contributions" from naturalists in mid-career, the Jasper Loftus-Hills Young Investigators Award for promising scientists early in their careers, and also the Ruth Patrick Student Poster Award.

References

 The American Society of Naturalists
  American Naturalist
 Archive Records of the American Society of Naturalists (1884) links to other records of the society, and out of copyright issues of the American Naturalist

Biology organizations based in the United States
Organizations established in 1883
Scientific societies based in the United States
Naturalist societies
1883 establishments in the United States